Heber City Municipal Airport , also known as Russ McDonald Field, is a city-owned, public-use airport located  south of Heber City, in Wasatch County, Utah, United States, east of Salt Lake City. The airport is untowered and was activated in November 1947. It is included in the National Plan of Integrated Airport Systems for 2011–2015, which categorized it as a general aviation facility.

Facilities and aircraft
It has one runway designated 4/22 with an asphalt surface measuring 6,899 by 75 feet with a PCN rating of 32/F/B/X/T .

Since 1986 the airport has received over $17 million in federal grant funds for development and improvements from the FAA's Airport and Airway Trust Fund.

For the 12-month period ending December 31, 2008, the airport had 28,302 aircraft operations, an average of 77 per day: 94% general aviation, 5% air taxi, and less than 1% military. At that time there were 96 aircraft based at this airport: 69% single-engine, 6% multi-engine, 6% jet, 3% helicopter, and 16% glider.

The airport has been cited since 2016 by the Aircraft Owners and Pilots Association as an airfield that has egregious prices and fees. AOPA has asked the city of Heber to increase business competition at the airport by allowing additional fixed-base operators at the airport. However, the Heber City Council voted to revert to 2016 airport minimum standards and suspend consideration of a new FBO and self-service fuel until completion of a new airport master plan.

See also
 List of airports in Utah

References

External links

 Aerial image as of July 1997 from USGS The National Map
 
 

Airports in Utah
Buildings and structures in Heber City, Utah
Transportation in Wasatch County, Utah